Polistes adustus is a species of paper wasp in the genus Polistes.

References

adustus
Insects described in 1897